Enter the Slasher House is the debut album by Avey Tare's Slasher Flicks, consisting of Avey Tare of Animal Collective, ex-Dirty Projectors member Angel Deradoorian, and ex-Ponytail drummer Jeremy Hyman. The first single from the album, "Little Fang", was named "Best New Track" by Pitchfork.

Musical style

In his brief review for Rolling Stone, Mike Ayers stated the record "has nothing to do with horror films and much to do with psychedelic rock."  Andy Beta of Spin echoed this, saying that "despite both band and album name, Slasher Flicks' sound is less haunted house than funhouse: dense, noisy, with squiggles of analog synth that recall AnCo's Centipede Hz."

Stuart Berman of Pitchfork compared the first track "A Sender" to two songs from the discography of Avey Tare's main group Animal Collective: "Did You See the Words" from 2005's Feels and "Peacebone" from 2007's Strawberry Jam, claiming its "bouncing-ball momentum...follows in the foot-stomps" of those "two totemic AC openers." Beta noted "A Sender"'s "opening analog synth...suggest an ominous horror movie atmosphere, but it soon gives way to a near-punk drive."

Critical reception

Track listing

Personnel
Avey Tare's Slasher Flicks
 Angel Deradoorian - Keyboards / backing vocals
 Jeremy Hyman - Drums
 Dave Portner - Guitars / leading vocals

References

2014 debut albums
Psychedelic rock albums by American artists
Domino Recording Company albums